Devazepide (L-364,718, MK-329) is benzodiazepine drug, but with quite different actions from most benzodiazepines, lacking affinity for GABAA receptors and instead acting as an CCKA receptor antagonist. It increases appetite and accelerates gastric emptying, and has been suggested as a potential treatment for a variety of gastrointestinal problems including dyspepsia, gastroparesis and gastric reflux. It is also widely used in scientific research into the CCKA receptor.

Synthesis
Devazepide is synthesised in a similar manner to other benzodiazepines.

See also 
Benzodiazepine
Cholecystokinin antagonist

References 

Benzodiazepines
Cholecystokinin antagonists
Indoles